is a Japanese actress, voice actress, singer and model from Saitama Prefecture. From 2009 to 2012, she starred in Cooking Idol! I! My! Main as Main Hiiragi, portraying the character in both animated and live-action segments. Following the series' end, she has starred in multiple television and film projects including Good Morning Call, Futari Monologue, Koe Girl!, Coffee & Vanilla, Hitsuji to Ōkami no Koi to Satsu-jin, and Laid-Back Camp. In animation, Fukuhara has provided the voice to Himari Arisugawa/Cure Custard in Kirakira PreCure a la Mode.

Aside from releasing songs for Cooking Idol! I! My! Main early in her career, in 2019, Fukuhara released her solo debut single, "Mikanseina Hikari-tachi."

Career 
Haruka Fukuhara started working as a child actress from the first grade of elementary school.

Since 2009, she plays and voices the leading role of Main Hiiragi in Cookin' Idol I! My! Mine!, a part anime, part live action show on NHK.

In 2012, she won a grand prix in the 20th audition for the teen fashion magazine Pichi Lemon, in which 9,000 people took part. Since then, she has worked as a model for the magazine.

On February 13, 2013, she released her fifth single, titled . The music video for the title track had been already watched 6.8 million times on YouTube by February 7. The music video is animated. The song by Fukuhara had been already released on a Various Artists' compilation titled Nameko no CD in July 2012; the song had been also chosen as an ending theme for the musical show  on TV Asahi.

Filmography

Live-action

Films

Television

Anime

Films

Television

Discography

Singles

Soundtrack appearances

Albums

Singles

Other songs

References

External links 
  at Ken On 
 

1998 births
Living people
Japanese child actresses
Japanese female models
Japanese television personalities
Japanese voice actresses
King Records (Japan) artists
Models from Saitama Prefecture
Musicians from Saitama Prefecture
Voice actresses from Saitama Prefecture
21st-century Japanese actresses
21st-century Japanese singers
21st-century Japanese women singers
Asadora lead actors